松原 may refer to:
Songyuan
Matsubara (disambiguation)